"Memory Boy" is the second Deerhunter single taken from Halcyon Digest. It was released on April 11, 2011, in the UK and in the US on April 16 to coincide with Record Store Day. The day before the single's announcement, the band played an extended version of the song with guest musicians Cole Alexander (of The Black Lips) and Adam Bruneau (of the Back Pockets) on the Late Show with David Letterman.

The single artwork was created by Bradford Cox. "Nosebleed" was a new recording for this release, and was not recorded during the sessions for Halcyon Digest.

Track listing
 "Memory Boy" - 2:08
 "Nosebleed" - 2:52

References

2011 singles
Record Store Day releases
4AD singles
Deerhunter songs
2010 songs